ENIC Group (formerly English National Investment Company) is a British investment company. ENIC is owned by Joseph "Joe" Lewis (through Tavistock Group). ENIC is Bahamas-registered subsidiary, ENIC International Limited, currently holds 85.55% of the total issued share capital of English Premier League club, Tottenham Hotspur. Club chairman Daniel Levy and his family own 29.4% of the share capital of ENIC International Limited, while Lewis owns 70.6%.

History
Previously a private investment trust, English National Investment Company was floated on the London stock exchange in 1997 as ENIC plc and became a holding company for sports, media and leisure businesses. During the football investment boom of the mid to late 1990s it began to acquire shares in football clubs around Europe and bought stakes in Tottenham Hotspur (29.9%), Rangers F.C. (25.1%), SK Slavia Prague (96.7%), AEK Athens F.C. (47%), Vicenza Calcio (99.9%) and FC Basel (50%).

As well as football clubs, ENIC also invested in other businesses, such as software company Autonomy, retailer Warner Bros. Studio Stores, gambling website ukbetting.com and entertainment complex Church Street Station.

In 2001 ENIC bought a controlling stake in Tottenham Hotspur F.C. from Alan Sugar and Levy became chairman of the club. Later in 2001, ENIC's listing was transferred from the main stock exchange to the AIM index.

In 2003 Joe Lewis and Daniel Levy, who controlled 52% of ENIC shares, formed Kondar Ltd to buy out the remaining shareholders. A cash offer of £40m was made to take the company back into private ownership. Following the buyout, Lewis and Levy controlled 70.6% and 29.4% respectively of shares in ENIC, which was delisted from AIM and renamed ENIC Group.

In May 2006 ENIC transferred 61% stake in SK Slavia Prague to Czech brokerage firm Key Investments. In January 2008 Key Investment breached the contract with ENIC and increased the equity of SK Slavia Prague.

Following its purchase of Sugar's remaining shares in Tottenham Hotspur in 2007, ENIC continued to build up its stake, taking its shareholding to 85%. To fund this investment it disposed of its stakes in other football clubs as well as many of its media and entertainment businesses.

On the 24 May 2022, Tottenham Hotspur announced a capital increase of up to £150 million from ENIC via the issue of shares. The announcement claimed "the equity injection provides the Premier League club with greater financial flexibility and the ability to further invest on and off the pitch."

See also
 Tavistock Group
 Tottenham Hotspur 
 Joe Lewis (British businessman)
 Daniel Levy (businessman)

References

External links
 Tavistock sports portfolio

Investment companies of the United Kingdom
Hotel and leisure companies of the United Kingdom
Tottenham Hotspur F.C.
Tavistock Group